Vanessa dilecta is a butterfly of the family Nymphalidae. The type locality is West Timor. It is sister to Vanessa buana and is sometimes lumped with that species.

References

Butterflies described in 1992
dilecta